Barrage of Fire (Spanish: Aluvión de Fuego) is a novel written by Óscar Cerruto and published in 1935.

Summary
Barrage of Fire recounts the cruel reality of Bolivian life during the Chaco War. The novel narrates the experiences of Mauricio Santa Cruz, a young man getting ready to go to war, whose expectations are turned around as he discovers the realities of a suffering nation, the great injustices being done to an entire people, and the ultimate reality of a nation engulfed in a flood of fire.

Reviews
A critical review of the book can be found in the "Ibero-American Magazine" of the University of Pittsburgh

References 

1935 novels
Works about the Chaco War
Novels set in Bolivia